Ovsyanikovo is a rural locality (a village) in Muromtsevskoye Rural Settlement, Sudogodsky District, Vladimir Oblast, Russia. The population was 34 as of 2010.

References 

Rural localities in Sudogodsky District